The 1962 British Formula Junior season was the 13th season of the British Formula Junior season. This was replaced by Formula Three specification cars in 1964. Peter Arundell took the B.A.R.C. Championship, while John Fenning took the B.R.C.S.S. Championship, as well as the B.R.S.C.C. John Davy British Championship.

B.A.R.C. Championship 
Champion:  Peter Arundell

Results

Table

B.R.S.C.C. Championship 
Champion:  John Fenning

Results

Table

B.R.S.C.C. John Davy Championship

Results

Table

References

British Formula Three Championship seasons
Formula Three
Formula Junior